WVLY-FM (100.9 MHz, "The Valley") is a commercial radio station licensed to serve Milton, Pennsylvania. The station is owned by Sunbury Broadcasting Corporation and broadcasts an adult contemporary format. Its broadcast tower is located southeast of Milton.

History
The Federal Communications Commission granted WMLP, Inc. a construction permit for the station on July 5, 1967 with the WMLP-FM call sign. The station's first license was granted on January 11, 1968.

The station's call sign was changed to WOEZ-FM on October 1, 1979. On September 23, 1994, the call sign was changed to WVLY, followed by a change to WVLY-FM on January 22, 2001.

Sunbury Broadcasting Corporation purchased the assets of WVLY-FM from Milton/Lewisburg Broadcasting Corporation on March 6, 2006.

References

External links

VLY
Mainstream adult contemporary radio stations in the United States
Radio stations established in 1967